Gemylus is a genus of beetles in the family Cerambycidae, containing the following species:

 Gemylus albipictus Pascoe, 1865
 Gemylus albosticticus Breuning, 1939
 Gemylus albovittatus Breuning, 1960
 Gemylus angustifrons Breuning, 1939
 Gemylus uniformis Breuning, 1939
 Gemylus upsilon Dillon & Dillon, 1952
 Gemylus wainiloka Dillon & Dillon, 1952

References

 
Cerambycidae genera